Santa Cruz City School District is a public school district in Santa Cruz County, California, United States. It serves 7,000 students in grades pre-K through 12, both within and outside the city of Santa Cruz. It comprises two districts, an elementary and a secondary district, governed by a single seven-member Board of Education.

The secondary school district has some areas where it serves grades 6-12 and others where it serves those only from grades 9-12. It also serves students from Bonny Doon School District, Happy Valley Elementary School District, Live Oak School District, Mountain School District, Pacific Elementary School District, and Soquel Union Elementary School District.

It also serves homeschooling programs and adult students, although it is considering whether to eliminate its adult education program for budgetary reasons.

The Santa Cruz City Elementary School District's four elementary schools are all significantly over capacity, leading the district to consider reclaiming and reopening a fifth elementary school that was leased to a charter school operator several years ago.

References

External links
 

School districts in Santa Cruz County, California